Minucci is an Italian surname. Notable people with the surname include:

Andrea Minucci (died 1572), Roman Catholic prelate who served as Archbishop of Zadar 
Chieli Minucci (born 1958), American jazz guitarist
Joe Minucci (born 1981), American football player
Minuccio Minucci (1551–1604), Italian Roman Catholic priest
Ulpio Minucci (1917–2007), Italian composer

Italian-language surnames